Minamikata Station is the name of two train stations in Japan:

 Minamikata Station (Miyazaki)
 Minamikata Station (Osaka)